Chapel is an unincorporated community in Putnam County, in the U.S. state of Missouri.

History
Chapel was originally named Quakersville; the present name is after the local Quaker chapel.  A post office called Chapel was established in 1897, and remained in operation until 1906.

References

Unincorporated communities in Putnam County, Missouri
Unincorporated communities in Missouri